Slothful induction, also called appeal to coincidence, is a fallacy in which an inductive argument is denied its proper conclusion, despite strong evidence for inference. An example of slothful induction might be that of a careless man who has had twelve accidents in the last six months and it is strongly evident that it was due to his negligence or rashness, yet keeps insisting that it is just a coincidence and not his fault. Its logical form is:
evidence suggests X results in Y, yet the person in question insists Y was caused by something else.

Its opposite fallacy (which perhaps occurs more often) is called correlation does not imply causation.

References

Inductive fallacies
Informal fallacies
Cognitive inertia